The 1926 Chicago Cardinals season was their seventh in the National Football League. The team failed to improve on their previous output of 11–2–1, winning only five games. They finished tenth in the league.

Schedule

Standings

References

Arizona Cardinals seasons
Chicago Cardinals
Chicago Cardinals